Lomatium piperi is a species of flowering plant in the carrot family known by the common name salt-and-pepper or Indian biscuitroot (and called mámɨn in the local Sahaptin language). It is native to the Northwestern United States and northern California, where it grows in sagebrush and plateau habitat, and the Sierra Nevada and Cascade Mountains.

Description
Lomatium piperi is a perennial herb growing up to about 25 centimeters long from a spherical tuber no more than a centimeter wide. There is generally no stem, the leaves and inflorescence emerging at ground level. The leaf blades are divided into segments which are subdivided into narrow, flat lobes. The inflorescence is an umbel of white flowers with dark anthers.

External links
 Calflora Database: Lomatium piperi (Indian biscuitroot,  Piper's lomatium)
Jepson Manual eFlora treatment of Lomatium piperi
USDA Plants Profile for Lomatium piperi (Indian biscuitroot)
UC CalPhotos gallery of Lomatium piperi

piperi
Flora of California
Flora of Idaho
Flora of Oregon
Flora of Washington (state)
Flora of the Cascade Range
Endemic flora of the United States
Taxa named by John Merle Coulter
Flora without expected TNC conservation status